There have been two baronetcies created for persons with the surname Coghill, both in the Baronetage of Great Britain. One creation is extant as of 2008.

The Coghill Baronetcy, of Coghill in the East Riding of the County of York, was created in the Baronetage of Great Britain on 31 August 1778 for John Coghill, of Coghill Hall, Knaresborough, Yorkshire, previously Member of the Irish House of Commons for Belturbet. Born John Cramer, he was the grandson of Oliver Cramer and his wife Hester, sister of Marmaduke Coghill, Chancellor of the Exchequer of Ireland, and succeeded in 1775 to the Coghill estates on the death of his cousin, Hester, daughter and heiress of James Coghill and widow of Charles Moore, 1st Earl of Charleville. The same year he assumed by Royal licence the surname of Coghill in lieu of Cramer. He was succeeded by his eldest son, the second Baronet. He assumed the surname of Coghill in lieu of Cramer by Royal licence in 1807.

He never married and was succeeded by his younger brother, the third Baronet. He was a vice-admiral in the Royal Navy. On succeeding to the title in 1817, he assumed the surname of Coghill in lieu of Cramer by Royal licence. He was succeeded by his eldest son, the fourth Baronet. He was high sheriff of County Dublin in 1859. He was succeeded in the baronetcy by his second son, the fifth Baronet. He was a landscape painter. He was succeeded by his eldest son, the sixth Baronet. He served as a deputy lieutenant of Hertfordshire. On his death the title passed to his younger brother, the seventh Baronet. As of 2008 the title is held by the latter's grandson, the ninth Baronet, who succeeded his father in 2000.

Other members of the family may also be mentioned. Nevill Coghill, eldest son of the fourth Baronet, was posthumously awarded the Victoria Cross for his actions in the Anglo-Zulu War. Nevill Henry Kendal Aylmer Coghill (1899–1980), second son of the fifth Baronet, was Merton Professor of English Literature at the University of Oxford. Sir Egerton Bushe Coghill married Elizabeth Hildegarde Augusta Somerville, whose sister was Edith Somerville, the author and artist.

The Coghill Baronetcy, of Richings in the County of Buckingham, was created in the Baronetage of Great Britain on 24 March 1781 for John Coghill. The title became extinct on his death in 1785.

Cramer-Coghill, later Coghill baronets, of Coghill (1778)

Sir John Cramer-Coghill, 1st Baronet (1732–1790)
Sir John Thomas Coghill, 2nd Baronet (1766–1817)
Sir Josiah Coghill Coghill, 3rd Baronet (1773–1850)
Sir John Joscelyn Coghill, 4th Baronet (1826–1905)
Sir Egerton Bushe Coghill, 5th Baronet (1853–1921)
Sir Marmaduke Nevill Patrick Somerville Coghill, 6th Baronet (1896–1981)
Sir Joscelyn Ambrose Cramer Coghill, 7th Baronet (1903–1983)
Sir Egerton James Nevill Tobias "Toby" Coghill, 8th Baronet (1930–2000)
Sir Patrick Kendal Farley Coghill, 9th Baronet (born 1960)
There is no heir to the title.

Coghill baronets, of Richings (1781)

Sir John Coghill, 1st Baronet (died 1785)

Notes

References
Kidd, Charles, Williamson, David (editors). Debrett's Peerage and Baronetage (1990 edition). New York: St Martin's Press, 1990, 

Baronetcies in the Baronetage of Great Britain
Extinct baronetcies in the Baronetage of Great Britain
1778 establishments in Great Britain